Germanicus Mantica (died February, 1639) was a Roman Catholic prelate who served as Bishop of Adria (1633–1639) and Titular Bishop of Famagusta (1620–1633).

Biography
On 17 August 1620, Germanicus Mantica was appointed during the papacy of Pope Paul V as Titular Bishop of Famagusta. On 28 October 1620, he was consecrated bishop by Giovanni Garzia Mellini, Cardinal-Priest of Santi Quattro Coronati, with Attilio Amalteo, Titular Archbishop of Athenae, and Paolo De Curtis, Bishop Emeritus of Isernia. serving as co-consecrators. On 21 February 1633, he was appointed during the papacy of Pope Urban VIII as Bishop of Adria. He served as Bishop of Adria until his death in February 1639.

Episcopal succession

References 

17th-century Roman Catholic bishops in the Republic of Venice
Bishops appointed by Pope Paul V
Bishops appointed by Pope Urban VIII
1639 deaths